The Copiphorini are a tribe of bush crickets or katydids in the family Tettigoniidae. Previously considered a subfamily (the Copiphorinae), they are now placed in the subfamily Conocephalinae. Like some other members of Conocephalinae, they are known as coneheads, grasshopper-like insects with an extended, cone-shaped projection on their heads that juts forward in front of the base of the antennae.

Description
In most species, the female is considerably larger than the male, and in some, the largest male is smaller than the smallest female. Like other members of the cricket suborder Ensifera, they differ from grasshoppers (suborder Caelifera) in having filamentous antennae that are longer than their bodies. Most species have loud songs which enable them to be identified. The call is made in most instances by the two fore wings rubbing together. Some species can hear with the aid of hearing organs in the tibia segments of their legs. The ovipositor is straight and slender and bears no teeth.

Genera 
Genera include:

 Acantheremus Karny, 1907
 Anacaona Yong, 2019
 Apoecides Bolívar, 1914
 Artiotonus Montealegre-Z., Morris, Sarria-S. & Mason, 2011
 Banza Walker, 1870
 Belocephalus Scudder, 1875
 Borinquenula Walker & Gurney, 1972
 Brachycaulopsis Fontana, Mariño-Pérez & Woller, 2013
 Bucrates Burmeister, 1838
 Caetitus Antunes, Chamorro-Rengifo & Takiya, 2018
 Caulopsis Redtenbacher, 1891
 Clasma Karsch, 1893
 Conocephaloides Perkins, 1899
 Copiphora Serville, 1831
 Coryphodes Redtenbacher, 1891
 Daedalellus Uvarov, 1940
 Dorycoryphus Redtenbacher, 1891
 Erioloides Hebard, 1927
 Eriolus Bolívar, 1888
 Eucaulopsis Hebard, 1931
 Euconocephalus Karny, 1907
 Eurymetopa Redtenbacher, 1891
 Gryporhynchium Uvarov, 1940
 Lamniceps Bolívar, 1903
 Lanista Bolívar, 1890
 Lanistoides Sjöstedt, 1913
 Liostethus Redtenbacher, 1891
 Lirometopum Scudder, 1875
 Loboscelis Redtenbacher, 1891
 Mayacephalus Cadena-Castañeda, Monzón-Sierra & Cortés-Torres, 2016
 Melanophoxus Karny, 1907
 Metacaputus Naskrecki, 2000
 Moncheca Walker, 1869
 Montesa Walker, 1869
 Mygalopsis Redtenbacher, 1891
 Neoconocephalus Karny, 1907
 Oxyprora Stål, 1873
 Panacanthus Walker, 1869
 Parabucrates Scudder, 1897
 Paroxyprora Karny, 1907
 Parvarhynchus Farooqi & Usmani, 2020
 Pedinostethus Redtenbacher, 1891
 Phaneracra Uvarov, 1936
 Phoxacris Karny, 1907
 Plastocorypha Karsch, 1896
 Pluviasilva Naskrecki, 2000
 Poascirtus Saussure, 1899
 Podacanthophorus Naskrecki, 2000
 Pseudorhynchus Serville, 1838
 Pyrgocorypha Stål, 1873
 Rombophora Yong, 2019
 Ruspolia Schulthess, 1898
 Santandera Koçak & Kemal, 2008
 Sphodrophoxus Hebard, 1924
 Toledopizia Chamorro-Rengifo & Braun, 2010
 Unicorniella Yong, 2019
 Vestria Stål, 1874
 Xestophrys Redtenbacher, 1891

References

Conocephalinae
Orthoptera tribes